Società Polisportiva La Fiorita is a Sammarinese football club, based in Montegiardino. The club was founded in 1967. Fiorita currently plays in Girone A of Campionato Sammarinese di Calcio. The team's colours are blue, yellow and white.

Honours
League
Campionato Sammarinese di Calcio
Winners (6): 1986–87, 1989–90, 2013–14, 2016–17, 2017–18, 2021–22
Runners-up (5): 1988–89, 1993–94, 1994–95, 1996–97, 2020–21

Domestic Cups
Coppa Titano
Winners (6): 1985–86, 2011–12, 2012–13, 2015–16, 2017–18, 2020–21
Runners-up (2): 1987–88, 1988–89
Trofeo Federale
Winners (3): 1986, 1987, 2007
Runners-up (1): 1996
Super Coppa Sammarinese
Winners (3): 2012, 2018, 2021
Runners-up (4): 2013, 2014, 2016, 2017

European record
On 4 July 2017, they earned their first draw in European Competition by drawing with Linfield from Northern Ireland.

On 21 June 2022, they scored their first goal in 2022-23 UEFA Champions League in a match against Inter Club d'Escaldes from Andorra.

Matches

Notes
 PR: Preliminary round
 1Q: First qualifying round
 2Q: Second qualifying round

Current squad
As of 1 February 2023.

References

External links
La Fiorita website
FSGC page

 
Association football clubs established in 1967
Football clubs in San Marino
Former Italian football clubs
1967 establishments in San Marino
Montegiardino